As Salatah (also known as Old Al Salata) is a district in Qatar, located in the municipality of Ad Dawhah. It is primarily a commercial district and is situated near Hamad International Airport. In the 1970s, as part of a master plan for Doha prepared by Llewelyn Davies, the whole district was redeveloped in a push to modernize the cityscape. The Civil Aviation Authority and the National Museum of Qatar are located in the district.

History

The district was named after the Sulaiti tribe, who owned large plots of land in the area. Sheikh Jassim bin Mohammed Al Thani selected the area as the seat of government in the early 1900s due to its close proximity to the sea and ease of access for vessels. The seat was later transferred to central Doha in 1923.

Historic landmarks

Al Sulaiti House
Constructed around the mid-20th century, it was one of the most sizable buildings in the district at the time it was inaugurated. It was later renovated in order to house the Qatar Folkloric Troupe. The building is rectangular in shape and encloses a large courtyard. After its renovation, the traditional roof was replaced with a concrete one.

See also
As Salatah al Jadidah (New Al Salata)

Gallery

References

Communities in Doha